Bago (formerly spelt Pegu;), formerly known as Hanthawaddy, is a city and the capital of the Bago Region in Myanmar.

Etymology
The Burmese name Bago (ပဲခူး) is likely derived from the Mon language place name Bagaw. Until the Burmese government renamed English place names throughout the country in 1989, Bago was known as Pegu. Bago was formerly known as Hanthawaddy (lit. "she who possesses the sheldrake"), the name of a Burmese-Mon kingdom.

An alternative etymology from the 1947 Burmese Encyclopedia derives Bago (ပဲခူး) from Wanpeku as a shortening of Where the Hinthawan Ducks Graze. This etymology relies on the non-phonetic Burmese spelling as its main reasoning.

History

Establishment

Various Mon language chronicles report widely divergent foundation dates of Bago, ranging from 573 CE to 1152 CE while the Zabu Kuncha, an early 15th century Burmese administrative treatise, states that Pegu was founded in 1276/77 CE.

The earliest possible external record of Bago dates to 1028 CE. The Thiruvalangadu plate describe Rajendra Chola I, the Chola Emperor from South India, as having conquered "Kadaram" in the fourteenth year of his reign- 1028 CE. According to one interpretation, Kadaram refers to Bago. More modern interpretations understand Kadaram to be Kedah in modern day Malaysia, instead of Bago. The earliest reliable external record of Bago comes from Chinese sources that mention Jayavarman VII adding Pegu to the territory of the Khmer Empire in 1195. The earliest extant evidence of Pegu as a place dates only to the late Pagan period (1212 and 1266) when it was still a small town, not even a provincial capital. After the collapse of the Pagan Empire, Bago became part of the breakaway Kingdom of Martaban by the 1290s.

Growth

The small settlement grew increasingly important in the 14th century as the region became most populous in the Mon-speaking kingdom. In 1369, King Binnya U made Bago the capital. 

According to the writings of Persian Abdur Razzak, Bago submitted tribute to the South Indian Vijayanagara Empire sometime in the 15th century.

During the reign of King Razadarit, Bago and Ava Kingdom were engaged in the Forty Years' War. The peaceful reign of Queen Shin Sawbu came to an end when she chose the Buddhist monk Dhammazedi (1471–1492) to succeed her. Under Dhammazedi, Bago became a centre of commerce and Theravada Buddhism.

In 1519, António Correia, then a merchant from the Portuguese casados settlement at Cochin landed in Bago, then known to the Portuguese as Pegu, looking for new markets for pepper from Cochin. A year later, Portuguese India Governor Diogo Lopes de Sequeira sent an ambassador to Pegu.

Toungoo dynastic capital

The city remained the capital until the kingdom's fall in 1538. The ascendant Toungoo dynasty under Tabinshwehti made numerous raids that the much larger kingdom could not muster its resources against. While the kingdom would have a brief resurgence for 2 years in the 1550s, Tabinshwehti's successor Bayinnaung would firmly come to control Bago in 1553.

In late 1553, Bago was proclaimed the new capital with commissioning of a new palace, the Kanbawzathadi Palace and Bayinnaung's coronation itself in January 1554. Over the next decade, Bago gradually become the capital of more land and eventually the largest empire in Indochina. A 1565 rebellion by resettled Shans in Bago burnt down major swaths of the city and the palace complex and the Kanbawzathadi Palace was rebuilt. Bayinnaung, this time, added 20 gates to the city named after the vassal who built it

After the 1565 rebellion by resettled Shans in Pegu, he faced no new rebellions for the next two years (1565–1567). Because the rebellion burned down major swaths of the capital, including the entire palace complex, he had the capital and the palace rebuilt. The new capital had 20 gates, each named after the vassal who built it. Each gate had a gilded two-tier pyatthat and gilded wooden doors.

The newly rebuilt Kanbawzathadi Palace was officially opened on 16 March 1568, with every vassal ruler present. He even gave upgraded titles to four former kings living in Pegu: Mobye Narapati of Ava, Sithu Kyawhtin of Ava, Mekuti of Lan Na, and Maha Chakkraphat of Siam.
 

As a major seaport, the city was frequently visited by Europeans, among these, Gasparo Balbi and Ralph Fitch in the late 1500s. The Europeans often commented on its magnificence. Pegu also established maritime links with the Ottomans by 1545.

The Portuguese conquest of Pegu, following the destruction caused by the kings of Tangot and Arrakan in 1599, was described by Manuel de Abreu Mousinho in the account called "Brief narrative telling the conquest of Pegu in eastern India made by the Portuguese in the time of the viceroy Aires de Saldanha, being captain Salvador Ribeiro de Sousa, called Massinga, born in Guimarães, elected as their king by the natives in the year 1600", published by Fernão Mendes Pinto in the 18th century. The 1599 destruction of the city and the crumbling authority of Bayinnaung's successor Nanda Bayin saw the Toungoo dynasty flee their capital to Ava.

The capital was looted by the viceroy of Toungoo, Minye Thihathu II of Toungoo, and then burned by the viceroy of Arakan during the Burmese–Siamese War (1594–1605). Anaukpetlun wanted to rebuild Hongsawadi and the glories of Bago, which had been deserted since Nanda Bayin had abandoned it. He was only able to build a temporary palace, however. 

The Burmese capital's return to Bago was short lived as the royal capital was once again relocated to Ava in 1634 by the next king Thalun to focus on the core of the smaller Burmese empire.

The fall of the Toungoo and Konbaung dynasty

In 1740, the Mon revolted and founded the Restored Hanthawaddy Kingdom. However, a Bamar king, Alaungpaya, captured the city in May 1757.

Bago was rebuilt by King Bodawpaya (r. 1782–1819), but by then the river had shifted course, cutting the city off from the sea. It never regained its previous importance. After the Second Anglo-Burmese War, the British annexed Bago in 1852. In 1862, the province of British Burma was formed, and the capital moved to Yangon. The substantial differences between the colloquial and literary pronunciations, as with Burmese words, was a reason of the British corruption "Pegu".

In 1911, Hanthawaddy was described as a district in the Bago (or Pegu) division of Lower Burma. It lay in the home district of Yangon, from which the town was detached to make a separate district in 1880. Hanthawaddy and Hinthada were the two most densely populated districts in the province.

Hanthawaddy, as it was constituted in 1911, consisted of a vast plain stretching up from the sea between the mouth of the Irrawaddy River and the Pegu Range. Except the tract of land lying between the Pegu Range on the east and the Yangon River, the country was intersected by numerous tidal creeks, many of which were navigable by large boats and some by steamers. The headquarters of the district was in Rangoon, which was also the sub-divisional headquarters. The second sub-division had its headquarters at Insein, where there were large railway works. Cultivation was almost wholly confined to rice, but there were many vegetable and fruit gardens.

Bago was severely damaged during earthquakes in May and December 1930. The May earthquake killed at least 500 people and triggered a tsunami.

Modern history

Today, Hanthawaddy is one of the wards of Bago's city proper. On 9 April 2021 during the Myanmar protests, Bago became the site of the Bago massacre, during which military forces killed at least 82 civilians following a protest crackdown.

Demographics

2014

The 2014 Myanmar census reported that Bago had a population of 254,424, representing 51.8% of Bago Township's total population. The town of Bago is subdivided into 34 wards.

2019
As of 2019, the city has 220,387 people based on the General Administration Department's estimates. 88.73% of the Township is Bamar with a significant Karen, Mon, Palaung and Burmese Indian population. Buddhists make up 94.2% of the city with Christianity being the second most populous at 4.2%. There are 749 monasteries, 92 nunneries and 134 stupas of various sizes including the tallest pagoda in Myanmar, the Shwemawdaw Pagoda. The city also has 9 churches, 6 mosques, 16 Hindu temples and 3 Chinese Mahayana temples.

Economy and transport
The main industries of Bago Township are agriculture and service sector employment. Bago city has an industrial zone with several factories, mostly in textiles and shoe-making. Smaller factories and workshops within the city also create food products, plastics, electric meters, motors, wood products, tea and halwa. Bago also has a small, but thriving tourism industry with many tourists from nearby Yangon. The Bago Development Committee manages 11 markets around the city. 

There are no airports within the township, and the city is served mostly by Yangon International Airport but the proposed Hanthawaddy International Airport serving Yangon and Bago may be located within Bago Township. There are two rail lines that pass through Bago, one going to Mandalay and another south to Mawlamyine. Bago also has several bus depots on its outskirts with intercity buses providing regular service. Bago is served by the Yangon–Mandalay Expressway as well as the old highways going to Taungoo and Myeik. Bago has seven major bridges crossing the Bago River in and around the city.

Climate
Bago has a tropical monsoon climate (Köppen Am), similar to most of coastal Myanmar, with a hot, dry season from mid-November to mid-April and a, hot, extremely humid, and exceedingly rainy wet season from May to October.

Places of interest

 Shwethalyaung Buddha (Reclining Buddha)
 Shwemawdaw Pagoda
 Kyaikpun Buddha
 Kanbawzathadi Palace site and museum
 Kalyani Ordination Hall
 Mahazedi Pagoda
 Shwegugyi Pagoda
 Shwegugale Pagoda
 Bago Sittaung Canal
 Butterfly lake (Lake-pyar-kan)

Sports
Bago has a 400 meter football field and 1 public fitness center.
 Grand Royal Stadium

Health care
The most common illness within the Township is diarrhea. Between 2017 and 2018, Bago Township saw 617 cases of HIV leading to 16 deaths. 

 Bago General Hospital (500-bedded Public Hospital)
 Bago Traditional Medicine Hospital

Education

Bago also has 9 high schools and a university. Bago's larger high schools have branches within the city. There are 28 monastic schools within the Township. Bago has a school attendance rate of 99.82% and 33% attendance rate for university. Overall, the literacy rate is 99.55%.  
 Bago University
 Basic Education High School No. 1 Bago
Basic Education High School No. 3 Bago

Notes

References

Bibliography

Further reading

International Dictionary of Historic Places: Asia and Oceania

Township capitals of Myanmar
Populated places in Bago Region
Old Cities of Mon people